Qntal III is the third album of the German darkwave/gothic rock group Qntal, released in 2003. It is a concept album based on the medieval narrative Tristan and Iseult. Many tracks feature original lyrics by poets of that period.

Track listing

Reception

German magazine Sonic Seducer gave Qntal III a positive review, remarking that the natural sound of III was something new after two albums of contrast between rather cold sounds and the vocals by singer Syrah. The album was lauded for its diverse interpretation of the Tristan tale using elements of ambient music, pop and world music. French magazine Prémonition observed that Ernst Horn's style had disappeared from Qntal's works after his leaving of the band but that Syrah's clear voice was still their main asset.

References

2003 albums
Dark wave albums